Ostravak  is a political movement in Ostrava, Czech Republic, that arose just before the 2010 municipal elections in response to "clientelism, arrogance of power, unprofessionalism, disrespect for the law, inefficient and uneconomical use of Ostrava property". Ostravak is a regional movement without national affiliation or ambitions to nationwide political participation. The Ostravak citizens' movement originated from the civic association "We Live in the City - Our Ostrava".

Main goals 
One of the main goals of the movement was to disrupt the existing grand coalition of the Czech Social Democratic Party (ČSSD) and the Civic Democratic Party (ODS), which they argued often did not respect the interests of the city's citizens.

Elections 
Apart from municipal and senate elections, the Ostravak movement does not participate in elections.

In the 2010 municipal elections, Ostravak ran only for the City of Ostrava (gaining 10 seats). and to Moravian Ostrava and Přívoz (gain of 10 seats). In Moravská Ostrava and Přívoz, the movement's increase in seats was more than that of the ODS (8 seats) and the ČSSD (9 seats).

In the 2012 Senate election, Leopold Sulovský, a candidate for the Ostravak civic movement, was elected in the Ostrava-město district. In the 2018, Sulovský defended his Senate seat, taking 59.89% of the vote.

Electoral results

Sponsorship 
Since its inception, Ostravak has received donations from citizens to a total of CZK 3,604,700. According to Marek Stoniš from Reflex Ostravak, the civic movement serves to promote the interests of businessman Lukáš Semerák, chairman of the board and co-owner of the real estate company S.P.I. Holdings, which is the largest donor to the movement.

References

External links 
 

Political parties established in 2010
Political parties in the Czech Republic
Ostrava
2010 establishments in the Czech Republic